The Horton Group is a geologic group in New Brunswick. It preserves fossils dating back to the Carboniferous period.

See also

 List of fossiliferous stratigraphic units in New Brunswick

References
 

Carboniferous New Brunswick
Oil shale in Canada
Oil shale formations